Melodi Grand Prix 2021 was the 59th edition of the Norwegian music competition Melodi Grand Prix (MGP). The contest served as the country's preselection for the Eurovision Song Contest 2021. The competition was organized by NRK and was held between 16 January 2021 and 20 February 2021. A total of 26 songs participated – the highest number in the history of the competition. 

The competition consisted of five semi-finals, a "wild card" show, and the final on Saturday 20 February 2021. A total of twelve songs participated in the final. Of these, six songs were pre-qualified, while the rest had to qualify through the five semi-finals and the wild card show. All shows were broadcast live from the H3 Arena in Fornebu, just outside Oslo.

The contest was won by the song "Fallen Angel" by Tix. The song therefore  in the Eurovision Song Contest 2021 in Rotterdam, Netherlands.

Format 

The contest was held without an audience due to the COVID-19 pandemic in Norway.

Presenters 
The competition was hosted by the same three presenters as the previous edition: Kåre Magnus Bergh hosted for the seventh time, whereas Ronny Brede Aase and Ingrid Gjessing Linhave hosted the show for the second time. Linhave left the show from the fifth semi-final, citing long-term back problems, and was replaced by Silje Nordnes.

Competing entries
Song submissions were open from 15 May 2020 to 16 August 2020. The competing entries in each semi-final were revealed five days before their respective semi-final's scheduled airdate. The six pre-qualified acts were revealed on 11 January 2021, along with the competing entries in the first semi-final.

Semi-finals

Semi-final 1 
The entries competing in the first semi-final were revealed on 11 January 2021, and the semi-final took place on 16 January 2021.

Semi-final 2
The entries competing in the second semi-final were revealed on 18 January 2021, and the semi-final took place on 23 January 2021.

Semi-final 3 
The entries competing in the third semi-final were revealed on 25 January 2021, and the semi-final took place on 30 January 2021.

Semi-final 4 
The entries competing in the fourth semi-final were revealed on 1 February 2021, and the semi-final took place on 6 February 2021.

Semi-final 5 
The entries competing in the fifth semi-final were revealed on 8 February 2021, and the semi-final took place on 13 February 2021.

Second Chance 
The second chance round took place on 15 February 2021.

Final 
Twelve songs consisting of the five semi-finals winners and one Second Chance alongside the six pre-qualified songs competed in the final which was hosted by H3 Arena, Fornebu on 20 February 2021.
In the first round, all twelve finalists performed once, after which the four best songs proceeded to the gold final. After the second voting round, the two best songs from the gold final proceeded to the gold duel. A third voting round then determined the winner of Melodi Grand Prix 2021.

After the gold duel, the results of the online voting were revealed by representatives of Norway's five regions, which led to the victory of "Fallen Angel" performed by Tix.

Incidents 

After the second semi-final, NRK revealed that there had been technical difficulties in the first two semi-finals, which caused votes from devices with older iOS and Android operating systems to be rejected. NRK stated that the results of the semi-finals were unaffected. The system was corrected for the later shows.

After the final, it was reported by Norwegian newspaper Verdens Gang that voting issues had again occurred in the final, and that some viewers' votes had not been counted. NRK stated that the voting system had interpreted the large number of votes as suspicious, and confirmed that the error did not affect the results.

Ratings

See also 

 Norway in the Eurovision Song Contest
 Norway in the Eurovision Song Contest 2021
 Eurovision Song Contest 2021

Notes

References

External links 

Melodi Grand Prix on NRK TV 

2021
2021 song contests
January 2021 events in Norway
Eurovision Song Contest 2021
February 2021 events in Norway
2021 in Norwegian music
2021 in Norwegian television